The rulers of western Persia, who maintained a very loose grip on the Abbasids of Baghdad. Several Turkish emirs gained a strong level of influence in the region, such as the Eldiduzids.
 Mahmud II 1118-1131
 Da'ud (in Jibal and Iranian Azerbaijan) 1131
 Tugrul II 1131-1134
 Mas'ud 1134-1152
 Malik Shah III 1152-1153
 Muhammad II 1153-1160
 Suleiman Shah 1160-1161
 Arslan Shah 1161-1174
 Tugrul III 1174-1194
Tugrul III killed in battle with the Khwarazmshah, who annexes Hamadan

Seljuk rulers